"Give It Back to the Indians" is a show tune from the  Rodgers and Hart musical Too Many Girls (1939), where it was introduced by Mary Jane Walsh.

The song is about the island of Manhattan, and the title alludes to its purchase from the Native Americans by Peter Minuit in 1626.

The song was not used in the film version of Too Many Girls (1940).

Notable recordings
Nancy Andrews - Too Many Girls (produced by Ben Bagley) (1988)
Ella Fitzgerald - Ella Fitzgerald Sings the Rodgers & Hart Songbook (1956)

References 

Songs about New York City
Songs about Native Americans
Songs with music by Richard Rodgers
Songs with lyrics by Lorenz Hart
1939 songs
Songs from Rodgers and Hart musicals